Artyom Chernov (28 April 1982 – 11 December 2020) was a Russian professional ice hockey centre who played for HC Vityaz of the Kontinental Hockey League (KHL). He was drafted 162nd overall by the Dallas Stars in the 2000 NHL Entry Draft.

Chernov made his Kontinental Hockey League debut playing with HC Dynamo Moscow during the 2010–11 KHL season.

Career statistics

Regular season and playoffs

International

References

External links

1982 births
2020 deaths
Atlant Moscow Oblast players
Avangard Omsk players
Avtomobilist Yekaterinburg players
Dallas Stars draft picks
HC Dynamo Moscow players
Metallurg Novokuznetsk players
Place of death missing
HC MVD players
HC Neftekhimik Nizhnekamsk players
Salavat Yulaev Ufa players
HC Spartak Moscow players
Russian ice hockey centres
Torpedo Nizhny Novgorod players
HC Vityaz players
People from Novokuznetsk
Sportspeople from Kemerovo Oblast